Santa Maria di Piazza may refer to:

 Santa Maria di Piazza, Serrapetrona, a church in Serrapetrona, Marche, Italy
 Santa Maria di Piazza, Turin, a church in Turin, Piedmont, Italy

See also 
 Santa Maria a Piazza
 Santa Maria in Piazza (disambiguation)